Section Liaison Air Yaoundé is the governmental airline of Cameroon based in Yaoundé. Its main base is Yaoundé Nsimalen International Airport.

Fleet
The Section Liaison Air Yaoundé fleet consists of the following aircraft (as of August 2019):

The airline previously operated a single Boeing 727 aircraft.

References

External links

Airlines of Cameroon